Mukhra may refer to:
 Mukhra (1988 film), a Pakistani Punjabi film
 Mukhra (1958 film), a Pakistani Punjabi film